Queenslandophilus is a genus of centipedes in the family Geophilidae. It was described by German myriapodologist Karl Wilhelm Verhoeff in 1925.
 Centipedes in this genus range from 2 cm to 6 cm in length, have 37 to 75 pairs of legs, and are found in Australia, Japan, and North America.

Species
Valid species:
 Queenslandophilus elongatus Verhoeff, 1938
 Queenslandophilus macropalpus Takakuwa, 1936
 Queenslandophilus monoporus Takakuwa, 1937
 Queenslandophilus sjoestedti (Verhoeff, 1925)
 Queenslandophilus viridicans (Attems, 1927)

References

 

 
 
Centipede genera
Animals described in 1925
Taxa named by Karl Wilhelm Verhoeff